Ibrahim Alemi was an Iranian jurist and politician. He received his degree in law in France. He served as the minister of labour in the cabinet of Mohammad Mosaddegh between November 1951 and August 1953. The British officials described Alemi as the most loyal minister in the cabinet.

References

20th-century Iranian politicians
Government ministers of Iran
National Front (Iran) politicians
Year of birth missing
Year of death missing